The 1992–93 Latvian Hockey League season was the second season of the Latvian Hockey League, the top level of ice hockey in Latvia. Fifteen teams participated in the league, and Pārdaugava Riga won the championship.

Regular season

Group A

Group B

Second round

Final round

Placing round

External links 
 Season on hockeyarchives.info

Latvian Hockey League
Latvian Hockey League seasons
Latvian